The 2018–19 3. Liga was the 26th season of the third-tier football league of Slovakia since its establishment in 1993. The league is composed of 63 teams divided in four groups of 16 teams each; only 3. liga Východ (East) includes 15 teams. Teams are divided into four divisions: 3. liga Bratislava, 3. liga Západ (West), 3. liga Stred (Central), 3. liga Východ (Eastern), according to geographical separation.

TIPOS III. liga Bratislava
source:

Locations

League table

Top goalscorers 
.

TIPOS III. liga Západ
source:

League table

Top goalscorers 
.

TIPOS III. liga Stred
source:

Locations

League table

Top goalscorers 
.

TIPOS III. liga Východ
source:

Relegated from 2. liga 

FK Spišská Nová Ves

Withdrew from 3. liga 

MFK Rožňava

Promoted from 4. liga 

AŠK Maria Huta (4. liga Juh (South) winners)
FK Humenné (4. liga Sever (North) winners)

Locations

League table

Top goalscorers 
.

References

3. Liga (Slovakia) seasons
3
Slovak Third League